Sarah Halvorsen (born 13 August 1995) is an Australian rules footballer who played for Greater Western Sydney in the AFL Women's (AFLW).

References

External links

 

Living people
1995 births
Greater Western Sydney Giants (AFLW) players
Australian rules footballers from New South Wales
Sportswomen from New South Wales